Yauheni Hutarovich (born 29 November 1983) is a Belarusian former road racing cyclist, who competed professionally between 2007 and 2016 for the , ,  and  teams. He currently works as a directeur sportif for UCI Continental team .

Career
In the 2009 Tour de France, Hutarovich was the lanterne rouge, or the last placed overall rider in the general classification (GC). On stage 2 of the 2010 Vuelta a España, Hutarovich surprised everyone as he jumped from the wheel of Mark Cavendish to claim his first Grand Tour stage win, besting other top sprinters such as Tyler Farrar and Alessandro Petacchi.

Hutarovich left  at the end of the 2012 season, and joined  on a two-year contract from the 2013 season onwards. In September 2014  announced that they had signed Hutarovich on a one-year deal for 2015. He remained with the team in 2016, before retiring at the end of the season.

Major results

2003
 3rd Road race, National Road Championships
2006
 Circuit des Ardennes
1st Stages 3 & 4
 1st Stage 1a Tour Alsace
 3rd Overall Tour de la Manche
1st Stages 1 & 4
 5th Road race, National Road Championships
 5th Paris–Mantes-en-Yvelines
2007
 1st Stage 2 Tour du Poitou-Charentes
 2nd Grand Prix de la ville de Pérenchies
 3rd Road race, National Road Championships
 4th Tour de Vendée
 5th Boucles de l'Aulne
2008
 1st  Road race, National Road Championships
 1st Stage 2 Driedaagse van West-Vlaanderen
 Vuelta a Burgos
1st Stages 2 & 4
 4th Châteauroux Classic
 6th Nokere Koerse
 10th Tro-Bro Léon
 10th Dutch Food Valley Classic
2009
 1st  Road race, National Road Championships
 1st Grand Prix de la Somme
 Tour Méditerranéen
1st Stages 1 & 5
 1st Stage 6 La Tropicale Amissa Bongo
 1st Stage 2 Circuit de Lorraine
 3rd Grand Prix de Fourmies
 6th Dwars door Vlaanderen
 10th Overall Circuit Franco-Belge
 10th Paris–Tours
2010
 1st Stage 2 Vuelta a España
 Tour Méditerranéen
1st Stages 1 & 3
 1st Stage 1 Circuit de Lorraine
 1st Stage 3 Tour de Pologne
 4th Le Samyn
 7th Grand Prix de Denain
2011
 1st Coppa Bernocchi
 1st Nationale Sluitingsprijs
 1st Stage 1 Étoile de Bessèges
 1st Stage 2 Tour du Poitou-Charentes
 2nd Kuurne–Brussels–Kuurne
 2nd Ronde Pévéloise
 2nd Châteauroux Classic
 2nd Paris–Brussels
 3rd Scheldeprijs
 5th Road race, National Road Championships
 5th Le Samyn
 5th Nokere Koerse
 5th Kampioenschap van Vlaanderen
 6th Memorial Rik Van Steenbergen
 6th Grand Prix de Fourmies
2012
 1st  Road race, National Road Championships
 Tour de l'Ain
1st Stages 1 & 2a
 2nd Kuurne–Brussels–Kuurne
 2nd Châteauroux Classic
2013
 2nd Classic Loire Atlantique
 2nd Route Adélie
 3rd Val d'Ille Classic
 3rd La Roue Tourangelle
 7th Road race, National Road Championships
 8th Grand Prix de Fourmies
 10th Down Under Classic
2014
 1st  Road race, National Road Championships
 1st Grand Prix de la Somme
 Tour de Pologne
1st  Points classification
1st Stage 1
 2nd La Roue Tourangelle
 2nd Grand Prix d'Isbergues
 2nd Paris–Bourges
 5th Grand Prix de Denain
 8th Gent–Wevelgem
 8th Tour de Vendée
 10th Dwars door Vlaanderen
2015
 La Tropicale Amissa Bongo
1st Stages 5, 7 & 8
 2nd Arnhem–Veenendaal Classic
 2nd Tour de Vendée
 3rd Overall World Ports Classic
 3rd Scheldeprijs
 9th Classica Corsica
 9th Kampioenschap van Vlaanderen
 10th Road race, National Road Championships
2016
 1st Stage 7 La Tropicale Amissa Bongo
 2nd Minsk Cup
 3rd Grand Prix Minsk
 5th Nokere Koerse
 5th Arnhem–Veenendaal Classic
 7th Road race, National Road Championships

Grand Tour general classification results timeline

References

External links

 

1983 births
Living people
Belarusian male cyclists
Belarusian Vuelta a España stage winners
Cyclists at the 2012 Summer Olympics
Olympic cyclists of Belarus
Cyclists from Minsk
European Games competitors for Belarus
Cyclists at the 2015 European Games